Year 953 (CMLIII) was a common year starting on Saturday (link will display the full calendar) of the Julian calendar.

Events 
 By place 

 Byzantine Empire 
 Battle of Marash: Emir Sayf al-Dawla marches north into the Byzantine Empire and ravages the countryside of Malatya (modern Turkey). On his way back, he crosses the Euphrates and intercepts a Byzantine army led by Bardas Phokas (the Elder), near Marash. The Byzantines are defeated; Bardas himself barely escapes through the intervention of his attendants. His son Constantine Phokas, governor of Seleucia, is captured and held prisoner in Aleppo, until his death from an illness some time later.

 Europe 
 Summer – Liudolf, duke of Swabia, and his brother-in-law Conrad the Red rebel against King Otto I. Otto and his army fail to capture the cities of Mainz and Augsburg. He declares Liudolf and Conrad as outlaws in absentia. His brother Bruno I, archbishop of Cologne, restores royal authority in Lorraine, but some of the rebellious dukes receive support from the Hungarians. They seize the opportunity to invade Bavaria. 
 The town of Póvoa de Varzim is first mentioned during the rule of Mumadona Dias, countess of Portugal, under the name Villa Euracini.

 Africa 
 March 19 – Caliph al-Mansur bi-Nasr Allah dies after a severe illness. He is succeeded by his 21-year-old son al-Mu'izz li-Din Allah as ruler of the Fatimid Caliphate. His authority is recognized over most of what later will be Algeria, Morocco, and Tunisia.

Births 
 September 14 – Guo Zongxun, Chinese emperor (d. 973)
 September 21 – Abu Ishaq Ibrahim, Buyid prince
 Charles, duke of Lower Lorraine (d. 993)
date unknown
Fujiwara no Korenari, Japanese courtier (d. 989)
Fujiwara no Michitaka, Japanese nobleman (d. 995)
Herbert III, count of Vermandois (d. 1015)
Kisai Marvazi, Persian author and poet (d. 1002) 
Watanabe no Tsuna, Japanese samurai (d. 1025)
Xiao Yanyan, Chinese Khitan empress (d. 1009)
probable 
Ælfheah, archbishop of Canterbury (d. 1012)
Al-Karaji, Persian mathematician  
Bermudo II, king of León and Galicia

Deaths 
 March 19 – al-Mansur bi-Nasr Allah, Fatimid caliph (b. 913)
 August 1 – Yingtian, Chinese Khitan empress (b. 879)
 November 18 – Liutgard, duchess of Lorraine (b. 931)
date unknown
Abas I, king of the Bagratuni Dynasty (Armenia)
Mastalus I, penultimate patricius of Amalfi (Italy) 
Ma Yinsun, Chinese official and chancellor
Muhammad bin Musafir, Sallarid ruler (approximate date)
Rasso, Frankish military leader, pilgrim and saint
Wang Jun, Chinese singer and chancellor
probable 
Æthelgar, bishop of Crediton 
Rhodri ap Hywel, king of Deheubarth (Wales)

References